Centro Educativo Español de La Habana (CEEH) is a private Spanish curriculum, Spanish-language international school in Havana, Cuba. It consists of two campuses, a nursery through primary campus and a secondary campus, in Miramar, Playa.

It serves nursery (age 2) up until bachillerato (senior high school/sixth form college). Students are sons and daughters of Spanish citizens resident in Havana, other foreigners, diplomats, and businesspersons.

References

External links

 Centro Educativo Español de La Habana 
 Centro Educativo Español de La Habana 

Schools in Havana
International schools in Cuba
Cuba–Spain relations